Admirals (previously referred to as Admiral Markets) is a Tallinn, Estonia-based trading platform for forex, contracts for difference (CFDs) and foreign exchange transactions across various financial markets. Established in 2001 by Alexander Tsikhilov, it is listed on the Nasdaq Nordic stock exchange.

History 
Admirals was founded in 2001 in Kesklinn, Estonia by Alexander Tsikhilov, a former engineer.
In 2019, Admiral Markets started collaborating with Trading Central, Acuity and Dow Jones & Company to provide a analytical portal for its clients. The company was registered as Security and commodity contracts broker in 2003,  and listed on Nasdaq Tallinn's Baltic Bond Lis in January 2018.  
In 2019, Admiral Markets received Global Banking & Finance Awards as the Best Forex Company Estonia 2019.  It was awarded ADVFN International Financial Awards in 2021. In 2021, the company changed its brand name from Admiral Markets to Admirals.
As of 2021, the company has affiliates and trading licenses in the United Kingdom, Cyprus, Australia and Jordan.

In March 2021, the company rebranded from "Admiral Markets" to "Admirals", also changing the company's logo. As the sources note: "A major reason behind Admirals recent rebranding is the need to develop into an integrated personal finance hub that delivers effective solutions for spending, managing and investing funds... the company seeks to provide simplified personal finance services for more than 10 million users within the next decade."

In June 2022, Admirals SA (PTY) Ltd, an operating subsidiary of Admirals, received regulatory approval to offer CFD trading to investors in South Africa.
 
As of 2022, Admiral Markets Group had representative offices in 18 countries through its regulated investment company subsidiaries and had a client portfolio in more than 145 countries. In the same year, Admirals started its operations in Jordan, expanding its presence in the Middle East and North Africa (MENA) region, and also obtained a license for financial activities in South Africa.

Management
In 2017, Admiral Markets underwent a change in its management after Jens Chrzanowski, Victor Gherbovet and Mindaugas Deksnys were appointed on the board along with Sergei Bogatenkov and James Chernikov, who had been serving on the board previously. In 2018, Stephen Ayme was appointed as the company's General Manager, replacing Simon Roberts. 
 
In September 2022, Board of Admirals consisted of two members: Sergei Bogatenkov and Andrey Koks after Jens Chrzanowski left the company.

Controversies 
Admiral Market reported fake, clone websites offering unrealistic promises using the brand of Admiral Market and this happened several times, specifically in the year 2017, 2018 and 2020.
 
In March 2020, the mass media reported that Admiral Markets allegedly exited from the Poland Market, though the company stated denying such a report that, its polish branch was scheduled for a "switch of affiliations" as previously the branch had been working under the Estonian arm whereas it had been switched to be worked under its subsidiary Admiral Markets Cyprus Ltd, which is a CySEC regulated firm.  
 
In February 2021, Estonian financial watchdog Finantsinspektsioon fined Admiral Markets a sum of €32,000 for allegedly not complying its legal obligations toward  providing investment services. Consequently, the company moved to the Harju County Court, challenging the imposition of fine by Finantsinspektsioon. On April 1, 2021, The Harju County Court annulled the decision of the fine by Finantsinspektsioon. On May 26, The second-tier Tallinn Circuit Court endorsed the decision of Harju County Court.

Further reading 
 Williams, B. M., Gregory-Williams, J. (2004). Trading Chaos: Maximize Profits with Proven Technical Techniques. United Kingdom: Wiley. ISBN 9780471463085 
 Lownsbrough, R. (2020). Scalp the Forex Markets - Bank 50 Pips a Day. (n.p.): ISBN 9781716936937.
 Financial Behavior: Players, Services, Products, and Markets. (2017). United States: Oxford University Press. ISBN 9780190269999.

References

External links 
 Website of Admirals

Online brokerages
Companies of Estonia
Foreign exchange companies